Brillion may refer to:

 Brillion, Wisconsin
 Brillion (town), Wisconsin
 Brillion Iron Works, foundry and farm implement manufacturer